Gabi Adrian Boitan (born 11 July 1999) is a Romanian tennis player.

Boitan has a career high ATP singles ranking of 722, achieved on 22 November 2021. He also has a career high ATP doubles ranking of 1311, achieved on 22 November 2021.

Boitan represents Romania at the Davis Cup, where he has a W/L record of 1–0.

Boitan currently plays college tennis at Baylor University.

ATP Challenger and ITF World Tennis Tour finals

Singles: 6 (3–3)

References

External links

Gabi Adrian Boitan at Baylor University

1999 births
Living people
Romanian male tennis players
Baylor Bears men's tennis players
Sportspeople from Constanța
21st-century Romanian people